El Ingenio is a Panama Metro station on Line 1. It was originally scheduled to open in August 2014, but opened on 8 May 2015. The station cost US$30 million and was officially opened by ministers Roberto Roy and Álvaro Alemán. It was the thirteenth station opened on the network and is the final underground station before the elevated 12 de Octubre station.

It serves the neighbourhood of El Ingenio, the major thoroughfare of Avenida Transístmica and also provides access to many colleges located nearby.

References

Panama Metro stations
2015 establishments in Panama
Railway stations opened in 2015